Samuel Hope Morley, 1st Baron Hollenden DL JP (3 July 1845 – 18 February 1929), was a British businessman.

Early life
Morley was the son of Samuel Morley and Rebekah Maria Hope, daughter of Samuel Hope of Liverpool. The Liberal politician Arnold Morley was his younger brother. He completed a master's degree at Trinity College, Cambridge in 1872.

His maternal grandfather was Samuel Hope of Liverpool and his paternal grandparents were Sarah ( Poulton) Morley and John Morley, a hosiery manufacturer.

Career
He was a partner in the firm of I. and R. Morley, Wood street; and served as Governor of the Bank of England from 1893 to 1895. He lived in Grosvenor Square.On 9 February 1912, he was raised to the peerage as Baron Hollenden, of Leigh in the County of Kent.

He held the office of Justice of the Peace and Deputy Lieutenant of Kent and, later Justice of the Peace for the County of London.

Personal life
On 6 March 1884, Morley married Laura Marianne Birch (d. 1945), a daughter of Reverend G. Royds Birch. Together, they were the parents of two sons:

 Geoffrey Hope-Morley, 2nd Baron Hollenden (1885–1977), who married three times.
 Hon. Claude Hope-Morley (1887–1968), who married Lady Dorothy Mercer-Henderson, a daughter of the 7th Earl of Buckinghamshire, in 1911.

He died in February 1929, aged 83, and was succeeded in the barony by his son Geoffrey. Lady Hollenden died in 1945. As the second baron had no male heirs, the subsequent barons were all descended from Lord Hollenden's second son Claude.

Arms

References

External links

1845 births
1929 deaths
British bankers
Barons in the Peerage of the United Kingdom
Deputy Governors of the Bank of England
Governors of the Bank of England
High Sheriffs of the County of London
Progressive Party (London) politicians
Members of London County Council
Barons created by George V